Ilzat Toglokovich Akhmetov (born 31 December 1997) is a Russian professional footballer who plays as a central midfielder for FC Krasnodar. Earlier in his career he mostly played in the attacking midfielder position.

Personal life
Born in Kyrgyzstan to Uyghur parents, Akhmetov moved to Russia at 11.

Club career
He made his professional debut in the Russian Professional Football League for FC Rubin-2 Kazan on 18 July 2014 in a game against FC Syzran-2003 Syzran.

He made his debut for the main FC Rubin Kazan squad on 24 September 2014 in a Russian Cup game against FC Luch-Energiya Vladivostok. He made his Russian Premier League debut for Rubin Kazan on 20 October 2014 in a game against FC Mordovia Saransk.

On 15 June 2018, FC Zenit Saint Petersburg announced that Akhmetov would join them for a try-out during the first pre-season camp.

On 26 July 2018, CSKA Moscow announced the signing of Akhmetov on a four-year contract. Akhmetov left CSKA as a free agent in June 2022.

On 7 July 2022, Krasnodar announced the signing of Akhmetov on a contract until 30 June 2024.

International
He was able to represent for either Kyrgyzstan or Russia. Manager of Kyrgyzstan Aleksandr Krestinin, a Russian himself, tried to call him up, but he ultimately chose the latter.

He was called up to the Russian team for the first time in November 2018 for games against Germany and Sweden. He was forced to miss the callup due to injury.

He made his debut for the team on 21 March 2019 in a UEFA Euro 2020 qualifier against Belgium, as a starter.

Career statistics

Club

International

References

External links
 
 

1997 births
Sportspeople from Bishkek
Russian people of Kyrgyzstani descent
Russian people of Uyghur descent
Uyghur sportspeople
Kyrgyzstani emigrants to Russia
Living people
Kyrgyzstani footballers
Russian footballers
Russia youth international footballers
Russia under-21 international footballers
Russia international footballers
Association football midfielders
FC Rubin Kazan players
PFC CSKA Moscow players
FC Krasnodar players
Russian Second League players
Russian Premier League players